This is a list of school districts in Quebec, grouped by administrative region and language. Since 2020 each french school service centre cover five school districts.

School districts
Quebec, school districts